The 2021 Texas A&M–Corpus Christi Islanders softball team represented Texas A&M University–Corpus Christi during the 2021 NCAA Division I softball season. The Islanders played their home games at the softball facility at Chapman Field and were led by second-year head coach Kristen Zaleski. They were members of the Southland Conference.

Preseason

Southland Conference Coaches Poll
The Southland Conference Coaches Poll was released on February 5, 2021. Texas A&M–Corpus Christi was picked to finish eleventh in the Southland Conference with 47 votes.

Preseason All-Southland team

First Team
Kaylyn Shephard (UCA, R-SR, 1st Base)
Cayla Joens (NSU, JR, 2nd Base)
Cylla Hall (UCA, R-SR, 3rd Base)
Cori McCrary (MCNS, SR, Shortstop)
Ella Manzer (SELA, SR, Catcher)
Samantha Bradley (ACU, R-SR, Designated Player)
Linsey Tomlinson (ACU, R-SR, Outfielder)
Kaylee Lopez (MCNS, SO, Outfielder)
Elise Vincent (NSU, SR, Outfielder)
Madisen Blackford (SELA, SR, Outfielder)
Megan McDonald (SHSU, SR, Outfielder)
Kayla Beaver (UCA, R-FR, Pitcher)
Kassidy Wilbur (SFA, JR, Pitcher)
E. C. Delafield (NSU, JR, Utility)

Second Team
Shaylon Govan (SFA, SO, 1st Base)
Brooke Malia (SHSU, SR, 2nd Base)
Bryana Novegil (SFA, SR, 2nd Base)
Caitlin Garcia (NICH, JR, 3rd Base)
Alex Hudspeth (SFA, JR, Shortstop)
Alexis Perry (NSU, SO, Catcher)
Bailey Richards (SFA, SR, Catcher)
Caitlyn Brockway (HBU, SO, Designated Player)
Reagan Sperling (UCA, R-JR, Outfielder)
Alayis Seneca (MCNS, SO, Outfielder)
Hayley Barbazon (NSU, SR, Outfielder)
Saleen Flores (MCNS, SO, Pitcher)
MC Comeaux (SELA, FR, Pitcher)
Sammi Thomas (TAMUCC, SO, Utility)

Roster

{| class="toccolours" style="text-align: left; font-size:90%;"
|-
! colspan="9" style="; text-align:center;"| 2021 Texas A&M Corpus Christi Islanders roster
|-
|width="03"| 
|valign="top"|
Pitchers
9 Sydney Hoyt - Freshman
13 Audrey McNeill - Freshman
20 Beatriz Lara - ''Sophomore21 Megan Depew - Freshman
73 Jenika Lombrana - SophomoreOutfielders3 Kennedy Jimenez - Junior
4 Madison Johnson - Freshman
11 Alexandria Torres - Freshman
24 Katrina Jackson - Redshirt Sophomore
26 Tiler Noyola - Junior
49 Alie Alcantar - FreshmanUtilities6 Daisy Gonzalez - Junior
22 Skye Koehl - Senior
33 Sammi Thomas - Sophomore

|width="15"| 
|valign="top"|Catchers15 Haley Morse - Freshman
17 Kayla Keith - Freshman
19 Kaylee Hoppens - Redshirt SophomoreInfielders1 Gabriella Torres - Freshman
2 Tiare Lee - Junior
5 Alyssa Escamilla - Sophomore
7 Mackenzie Purcell - Sophomore
10 Ashleigh Sgambelluri - Sophomore
12 Bailey Payne - Freshman
16 Narianna Hernandez - Freshman
18 Kayla Gonzalez - Freshman
27 Quinn de Avila - Sophomore
55 Pal Egan - Sophomore

|}

Coaching staff

Schedule and resultsSchedule Source:*Rankings are based on the team's current ranking in the NFCA/USA Softball poll.

Posteason
Conference Accolades 
Player of the Year: Kassidy Wilbur – SFA
Hitter of the Year: Shaylon Govan – SFA
Pitcher of the Year: Kassidy Wilbur – SFA
Freshman of the Year: Jenna Wildeman – UCA
Newcomer of the Year: Jenna Edwards – MCNS
Coach of the Year: Nicole Dickson – SFAAll Conference First TeamShaylon Govan (SFA)
Bryana Novegil (SFA)
Haylee Brinlee (MCNS)
Cori McCrary (MCNS)
Heidi Jaquez (HBU)
E. C. Delafield (NSU)
Mackenzie Bennett (SFA)
Jenna Wildeman (UCA)
Megan McDonald (SHSU)
Aeriyl Mass (SELA)
Kayla Beaver (UCA)
Kassidy Wilbur (SFA)All Conference Second TeamKaylyn Shephard (UCA)
Mary Kate Brown (UCA)
Lindsey Rizzo (SELA)
Camryn Middlebrook (SFA)
Hannah Scheaffer (SHSU)
Gaby Garcia (SFA)
Kaylee Lopez (MCNS)
Donelle Johnson (ACU)
Jil Poullard (MCNS)
Audrey Greely (SELA)
Jordan Johnson (UCA)
Whitney Tate (MCNS)All Conference Third TeamCaitlyn Brockway (HBU)
Cayla Jones (NSU)
Alex Hedspeth (SFA)
Ashlyn Reavis (NICH)
Chloe Gomez (MCNS)
Jasie Roberts (HBU)
Anna Rodenberg (SELA)
Kaitlyn St. Clair (NSU)
Sheridan Fisher (SHSU)Pal Egan (TAMUCC)Lyndie Swanson (HBU)
Heather Zumo (SELA)References:'''

References

Texas AandM-Corpus Christi
Texas A&M–Corpus Christi Islanders softball
Texas AandM-Corpus Christi Islanders softball